Tracy Quint is an American politician from Hodgdon, Maine. She is currently serving in the Maine House of Representatives from the 8th district, having first been elected in 2020 from the Republican Party.

Career 
Quint is a registered nurse.

In September 2020, incumbent Representative Gregory Swallow withdrew from the race for the Maine House of Representatives seat from the 144th district after winning the Republican primary unopposed. Tracy Quint announced that she would seek the seat instead in early October, running as a Republican. Her platform emphasized combatting obesity, support for small businesses, and support for the Second Amendment. Quint won the election, defeating Democrat Kathryn Harnish with 68 percent of the vote.

In March 2021, Quint introduced a bill that would ban mandates of the COVID-19 vaccine in Maine until 2024. Quint said the measure was "not an anti-vaccine bill", arguing in part that it was intended to stem reproductive harm. Patrick Whittle with the Associated Press pushed back on this claim, citing the Centers for Disease Control and Prevention's statement that there is "no evidence that any of the COVID-19 vaccines affect future fertility". Whittle also said that Maine was not considering any vaccine mandates at the time of the bill's drafting. The bill was later dropped in May 2021. Quint again introduced legislation prohibiting vaccine mandates in 2022; a legislative committee rejected it in January of that year.

In August 2021, Quint spoke at a rally protesting a COVID-19 vaccination mandate for Maine healthcare workers. The progressive States Newsroom affiliate Maine Beacon said that the event "validated false and dangerous claims about vaccines, at times framing the public health initiative as a government experiment in violation of individual liberties."

In November 2022, Quint won re-election to the Maine House of Representatives with 72.8% of the vote.

Personal life
Quint is married and has two children.

Electoral history

References 

Republican Party members of the Maine House of Representatives
Women state legislators in Maine
21st-century American politicians
Living people
21st-century American women politicians
Year of birth missing (living people)
American women nurses
American anti-vaccination activists
People from Aroostook County, Maine
Activists from Maine